The Anime Encyclopedia: A Guide to Japanese Animation Since 1917 is a 2001 encyclopedia written by Jonathan Clements and Helen McCarthy. It was published in 2001 by Stone Bridge Press in the United States, and a "revised and expanded" edition was released in 2006. In the United Kingdom, it was published by Titan Books. The third edition was released on 3 March 2015 with the subtitle of A Century of Japanese Animation. It gives an overview of most of the famous anime works since 1917.

Reception
Anime News Network's  George Phillips commends the encyclopaedia for "In-depth analysis of several major series, and discussions on hundreds of anime series rarely (if ever) heard of in the West" but criticises it for titles that "aren't listed under the names you suspect; can be quite confusing at first". Animation World Network's Fred Patten comments on the book being "300 pages larger; a 40% expansion" in its "Revised and Expanded" edition compared to the original volume. He commends the manga for being "designed for all readers; laymen and experts (fans and academicians) alike". Animefringe's Ridwan Khan commends the book for having "the entries summarize the plot, offer an opinion, and often discuss points of interest, including similar anime or historical roots. Icons indicating the presence of bad language, nudity, and violence follow each entry. For many, including librarians, parents, and club leaders, this is potentially a very useful at-a-glance feature". Patrick Macias from The Japan Times comments "while Clements and McCarthy's mastery of Japanese culture, both high and low, is impressive, the authors sometimes stumble when they try to step outside their fields of expertise". Valerie MacEwan commends the book saying, "only the most ardent aficionado of anime would find this volume lacking in detail. [It is] easy to use, fully indexed and cross-referenced with titles in Japanese and English". Sarah of Anime UK News criticises the book saying that Clement's and McCarthy's "descriptions can betray personal preferences which may not coincide with the reader's".

References

Further reading

External links
 Official site
 . Third revised edition (2015).

2001 non-fiction books
2007 non-fiction books
Books about anime
21st-century encyclopedias
Stone Bridge Press books